The 2007–08 season was Torquay United's first season in the Conference National after being relegated from League Two.  The season runs from 1 July 2007 to 30 June 2008.

Overview
Having been a Football League team for 80 years, Torquay United were finally relegated at the end of the 2006–07 season.  After the most chaotic and disastrous season in Torquay's history, chairman Mike Bateson eventually sold the club to an eight-man consortium with Alex Rowe appointed as the new chairman and former-Gull Colin Lee returning as chief executive.  Although Leroy Rosenior had previously been announced as the new manager, the consortium decided to go in a different direction and install ex-Torquay midfielder and current Exeter City assistant manager Paul Buckle as the new boss.  With only a handful of players still on the club's books, Buckle had to work fast to build a new team in time for Torquay's first season in the Conference.

Despite a slightly nervous 0–0 draw with Grays Athletic in their first ever Conference match, the Gulls soon established themselves within the division and quickly became the team to beat.  Buckle had managed to create a particularly potent strike force with new signings Tim Sills, Chris Zebroski and Lee Phillips combining to score nearly 50 league goals between them and Torquay were never out of the play-off spots all season.  United were also enjoying more TV coverage than ever before with Setanta Sports now televising live Conference games and the BBC even coming to Plainmoor to broadcast the 4–1 FA Cup First Round victory over League One side Yeovil Town.  Yeovil had themselves previously inflicted a cup 'upset' over Torquay in 1992 when they were a non-League side, so it was sweet revenge for the Gulls now that the two team's fortunes had been reversed.

After eventually finishing 3rd in the Conference, Torquay met their local rivals Exeter City in the play-off semi-final.  Despite coming away from St James Park with a 2–1 lead in the first leg and going 1–0 up in the return match at Plainmoor, Exeter managed to score four goals in the final 18 minutes of the match to condemn Torquay to a 5–3 aggregate defeat and another season in the Conference.  There was the possibility of a consolation for Torquay just a few days later as they had reached the final of the FA Trophy which entailed a trip to the new Wembley Stadium.  However, a 1–0 defeat by Ebbsfleet United resulted in another disappointing day for the Gulls.  Maybe the only highlight of the day was a late substitute appearance from Kevin Hill who made his 474th and final appearance for Torquay United, breaking the all-time appearance record which had been set by Dennis Lewis back in 1958.

Although Torquay United were perhaps a club who were fortunate to even still be in existence after the débâcle of the previous season, this was a campaign which had promised to deliver so much but had ultimately ended in disappointment.  Having failed to return to the Football League at the first attempt, Torquay would now have to make sure they achieved it at the second time of asking.

League statistics

Conference National

Results summary

Results by round

Season diary
 1 August: Darren Mullings joins after his release from Bristol Rovers
 1 August: Chris Zebroski joins on loan from Millwall
 12 August: Torquay play their first ever game in the Conference, a 0–0 draw away to Grays Athletic
 14 August: Ishmael Welsh joins on loan from Yeovil Town
 20 September: Scott Laird joins on a month's loan from Plymouth Argyle
 21 September: Defender Mark Ellis joins on loan from Bolton Wanderers
 11 November: Torquay beat League One Yeovil Town in an FA Cup First Round televised live by the BBC
 1 December: Torquay lose at home to Brighton & Hove Albion in the FA Cup Second Round
 19 December: Mark Ellis extends his loan stay until the end of the season
 22 December: Torquay exit Conference League Cup in Fourth Round after defeat away to St Albans City
 3 January: Winger Leslie Thompson joins on loan from Bolton Wanderers as a replacement for Ishmael Welsh who was recalled by Yeovil from his loan spell
 4 January: Manager Paul Buckle signs a new two-and-half-year contract
 7 January: Goalkeeper Michael Poke joins on loan from Southampton
 17 January: Goalkeeper Simon Rayner joins Boston United on loan
 24 January: Loanee Leslie Thompson returns to Bolton Wanderers
 27 January: Kaid Mohamed joins on loan from Swindon Town
 27 January: Steve Adams joins from Swindon Town on a free transfer
 27 January: Roscoe D'Sane joins from Accrington Stanley
 31 January: Danny Stevens signs new two-and-a-half-year contract
 31 January: Danny Wring leaves Torquay by mutual consent
 26 February: Mikkel Andersen joins on loan from Droylsden
 29 February: Jody Banim joins on loan from Droylsden
 29 February: Tony Bedeau joins Weymouth on loan
 5 May: Torquay exit Conference play-offs at semi-final stage after 5–3 aggregate defeat by Exeter City
 10 May: Torquay lose in final of FA Trophy to Ebbsfleet United at Wembley Stadium
 10 May: Kevin Hill breaks club appearance record
 13 May: Tony Bedeau, Matthew Hockley, Paul Hinshelwood and Darren Mullings released on free transfers
 16 May: Lee Phillips joins Rushden & Diamonds for an undisclosed fee
 19 May: Michael Brough joins from Forest Green Rovers
 20 May: Tyrone Thompson joins from Crawley Town on a two-year contract
 21 May: Mark Ellis joins from Bolton Wanderers on a two-year contract
 21 May: Lee Mansell signs new two-year contract
 28 May: Roscoe D'Sane signs a new one-year contract
 28 May: Nicky Wroe joins from York City for an undisclosed fee
 2 June: Matt Green joins from Cardiff City on a two-year contract
 3 June: Former Torquay player and manager Paul Compton appointed head of Torquay's new youth system
 11 June: Simon Rayner and Chris Robertson placed on transfer list
 13 June: Lee Hodges joins from Wycombe Wanderers
 30 June: Simon Rayner leaves to join Crawley Town

Match results
All friendly matches and first team games in Conference National, FA Cup, FA Trophy and Conference League Cup are listed below. Reserve matches and regional cup competitions are not included.

Conference National

Conference National play-offs

FA Cup

FA Trophy

Conference League Cup

Player statistics
As of final game of the season on 10 May 2008

Notes

References

Torquay United F.C. seasons
Torquay United